Lee Hoi-chang (born June 2, 1935) is a South Korean politician and lawyer who served as the 26th Prime Minister of South Korea from 1993 to 1994. He was a presidential candidate in the 15th, 16th and 17th presidential elections of South Korea. Prior to his presidential campaigns, Lee served as Supreme Court Justice of the Supreme Court of Korea.

Early life and education
Lee was born to an elite family in Seoheung, Hwanghae (part of what is now North Korea), but grew up in the South after his father, Lee Hong-gyu, a public prosecutor, was appointed to a new post. Lee studied law at Seoul National University. Lee served as a judge from 1960 to 1980, when he became the country's youngest-ever Supreme Court Justice at the age of 46.

Political career
In 1988, Lee was appointed Chairman of the National Election Commission. He was chosen to head the Board of Audit and Inspection under President Kim Young-sam in 1993. Lee's anti-corruption campaigns in that office gained him the nickname "Bamboo," a Korean term for an upright person of principle. Later in the same year, he was appointed prime minister, but resigned in 1994. His departure was attributed to a frustration with the exclusion of the office of the prime minister from policymaking, in particular with respect to North Korea.

In 1996, Lee led the parliamentary campaign of the then-ruling New Korea Party (NKP), which merged with the United Democratic Party to become the Grand National Party (GNP) in 1997. Lee was elected as his party's presidential candidate for the presidential election scheduled for that same year. Lee was initially considered the frontrunner in the race, although his performance in public polling took a hit amid revelations in September that two of his sons had been excused from mandatory military service for reporting for duty underweight, having each lost 22 pounds since their initial physical examinations. Lee ultimately lost to Kim Dae-jung in the midst of the Asian economic crisis.

Lee again campaigned to win the presidency in 2002, running against Roh Moo-hyun of the incumbent Millennium Democratic Party. Although corruption scandals marred the incumbent government, Lee's campaign suffered from the wave of Anti-American sentiment in Korea generated by the Yangju highway incident. Public opinion of Lee, who was widely seen as being both pro-U.S. and the preferred candidate of the George W. Bush Administration in Washington, D.C., suffered. After losing to Roh by 2% in the December 2002 elections, Lee subsequently announced his retirement from politics.

On November 7, 2007, Lee officially announced his third campaign for the South Korean presidency as an unaligned candidate after quitting the GNP. Launching his campaign late in the race, some two months prior to the election, Lee joined GNP candidate Lee Myung-bak, UNDP contender Chung Dong-young, and Moon Kook-hyun. Running to the right of his opponents, Lee criticized foreign aid to North Korea, arguing that such programs were fiscally burdensome and inappropriate while North Korea continued to pursue the development of nuclear weapons. His presidential bid posed a concern to the conservatives who were eager to regain the presidency after a decade of leftist rule, as it was feared Lee's candidacy would divide the conservative vote; however, Lee Myung-Bak won the December elections with 48.7% of the vote, while Lee Hoi-chang came in third, with approximately 15%.
After his 2007 election bid, Lee founded the Liberty Forward Party.

Political positions
Lee has been described as a staunch conservative in the context of South Korean politics. His positions include anti-communism, support for free market capitalism, and a hard-line stance against North Korea. Lee repeatedly criticized Kim Dae-jung's "Sunshine Policy" of engagement and détente with North Korea, and argued for the cessation of foreign aid until the North should dismantle its nuclear weapon program. Lee has called for a crackdown on illegal strikes, and for the appointment of more women to government offices.

References

External links

1935 births
Advancement Unification Party politicians
Bareun Party politicians
Kyunggi High School alumni
Living people
Liberty Korea Party politicians
Conservatism in South Korea
Seoul National University School of Law alumni
South Korean anti-communists
20th-century South Korean judges
South Korean Roman Catholics
Jeonju Yi clan
Justices of the Supreme Court of Korea